A skid block is a common term for a mandatory attachment to the underside of a racing car. Initially applied to Formula One cars in 1994, it has also been used in other categories including Formula 3000 and Formula Three. It is a flat rectangle, usually made of a wood composite, designed to impose a minimum ground clearance and to limit the use of ground effects to enhance handling.

Specification
According to the technical specifications governing F1, a rectangular skid block must be fitted beneath the central plane of the car. This skid block may comprise more than one piece but must:
 extend longitudinally from a point lying 330mm behind the front wheel centre line to the centre line of the rear wheels
 be made from a homogeneous material
 have a width of 300mm with a tolerance of +/- 2mm.
 have a thickness of 10mm with a tolerance of +/- 1mm.
 have a uniform thickness when new.
 be fixed symmetrically about the centre line of the car in such a way that no air may pass between it and the surface formed by the parts lying on the reference plane.

Typical construction
The skid block was introduced as part of the safety changes that followed Ayrton Senna's death. The block is usually made of a material called Jabroc. Jabroc is made of beechwood and built in a composite process. Veneers are layered and a high strength resin is used in each layer. They are pressurized and pressed, and brought to a certain and very consistent material density. As a result, each Jabroc skid plank is all but identical in terms of wear rate and material density.
 
The plank does not in itself restrict airflow under the car. It is used as a gauge which restricts the minimum ride height attainable by the car. The closer the car is to the ground, the more efficient the front wing and rear diffuser. The higher the down force levels, the faster a driver may corner. Cornering loads can push the car down much lower to the road, which can be dangerous and so the skid block was introduced to counteract this. The thickness of the plank is one of the parc ferme tests. If it is found to be worn beyond the allowed limit the car is disqualified.

Violations
Michael Schumacher in a Benetton was disqualified for an excessively worn plank in the 1994 Belgian Grand Prix. Schumacher spun out across the curb at Pouhon corner. Although the curb carved a pattern out into the plank, it was deemed by the FIA to have not been the cause for the excessive wear.

Jarno Trulli in a Jordan was initially disqualified for plank wear after the 2001 United States Grand Prix but the Jordan team successfully appealed the decision to the FIA International Court of Appeal because a steward was absent when the original decision was made, and Trulli's 4th-place finish was allowed to stand.

André Lotterer, Benoît Tréluyer and Marcel Fässler, driving the #7 Audi Sport Team Joest R18 e-tron, were excluded from the 2016 6 Hours of Silverstone after finishing in first place. Post-race scrutineering determined that the skid block was less than the 20 mm dictated by FIA World Endurance Championship rules.  The ruling was a blow to Audi's hopes in the first round of the WEC season, handing victory to the defending champion Porsche team. The team chose not to appeal.

References

Formula One